MDOT could refer to:

Maryland Department of Transportation
Michigan Department of Transportation
Mississippi Department of Transportation